Stracciata is a fresh pasta filata cheese produced in Italy. Stracciata is formed into flat strips of about 4–5 cm wide, 1 cm thick and folded in on itself in a uniform manner or woven wire, made with cow's milk. The name stracciata means "tattered" in Italian.

Production
Stracciata is produced in the municipalities of Agnone, Capracotta, Carovilli and Vastogirardi with milk from local breeds of cattle, mostly kept at pasture and fed with fodder. The milk from the evening milking and morning in the boiler is heated cans, to a variable temperature of 36°–38° Celsius (98°–100° Fahrenheit), depending on the weather.

Salt is added to milk. The whey "zizza" is prepared with the acid whey processing of the previous day and the rennet, mostly in powder, left to curdle for about 20–30 minutes. The curd is then broken into pieces the size of a grain of corn and allowed to cool for an hour or two. Finally part of the whey is removed to be used for ricotta, and the curd is left to precipitate and sottosiero rest for about 90 minutes. Then the curd is fed, rested on the table mitters cut and left to further acidify the optimal point: sometimes the cheese-maker assesses the maturation, testing the consistency between their fingers and trying spinning with a small aliquot of putting on a big spoon wood and immersed in boiling water. When the curd has reached the right maturity, it is further crushed, placed in wooden tub beech or oak and pour almost boiling water (90 °C / 194 °F).

The curd is kneaded with a wooden spoon (heaped), with movements of ironing, pressure, and modeled by hand. After about 10 minutes of spinning, the dough is formed into long strips to form large and flattened, firmer in cold water and then placed in brine. Subsequently the strip is portioned, tearing pieces of length of about 50 cm, which are then packaged bowing back three times on themselves, in pieces of about 400–500 g, to be consumed within a few days. The tattered is produced in all periods of the year even if particularly appreciated is the one produced in the summer months when the animals are conducted in the green pastures of Molise.

While using traditional materials and equipment (such as tin-plated copper boiler, wooden tub, wooden or steel) compliance with the rules of good hygiene practices and / or precise plans of self-control, allow you to adequately contain the contamination process. Moreover, the acidification of the curd and especially the spinning process in water at high temperature (90 °C / 194 °F), allow to reach approximately 64°–65 °C (147–149 °F) at the heart of the dough, with a further reduction of the microbial flora contaminant.

History
Stracciata ("tattered") derives its name from the act of "tearing" strips of cheese curds and spinning them into a long and flat piece. It originated in Molise, primarily in Agnone. It was especially eaten at parties and weddings, with household receptions in which, among other things, there was always the bread with ham and stracciata cheese. The stracciata cheese, due to its long, flat shape, was often laid on the bed of bread.

Serving indications
Stracciata is consumed primarily uncooked, accompanied by ham and olive oil or salad, no later than five days after production.

Rewards
Stracciata is not marketed in Lazio, but the Pope is buying dairy products from Molise, including stracciata, from the dairy Molise Franco Di Nucci: it is therefore an important reference point for the menu of the Pope and the Vatican City.

See also
 List of cheeses
 List of stretch-cured cheeses

References

Cow's-milk cheeses
Cuisine of Molise
Italian cheeses
Stretched-curd cheeses
Ark of Taste foods